The Parliament of the French Community ( or PCF) is the legislative assembly of the French Community of Belgium based in the Quartier Royal. It consists of all 75 members of the Walloon Parliament except German-speaking members (currently two) who are substituted by French-speaking members from the same party, and 19 members elected by the French linguistic group of the Parliament of the Brussels-Capital Region within the former body. These members are elected for a term of five years.

The current President of the Parliament of the French Community is Rudy Demotte (PS).

Bureau 
Sinсе 17 september 2019 the Bureau of Parliament has been composed as follows:
 Chairman: Rudy Demotte (PS)
 1st Vice-President: Caroline Cassart-Mailleux (MR)
 2nd Vice-President: Matthieu Daele (Ecolo)
 3rd Vice-President: Laurent Devin (PS)
 Secretary: Jean-Pierre Kerckhofs (PTB)
 Secretary: Philippe Dodrimont (MR)
 Secretary: Mathilde Vandorpe (cdH)

Compositions

2019-2024 (current)

2014-2019

See also
Government of the French Community
Minister-President of the French Community
Walloon Parliament
Flemish Parliament
Parliament of the German-speaking Community

External links

Communauté française de Belgique — Official site of the French Community.

 
1980 establishments in Belgium
French Community of Belgium